Mom Peak is a peak  high in the eastern part of Otway Massif, Antarctica,  southeast of Mount Petlock. It was mapped by the United States Geological Survey from surveys and U.S. Navy air photos of 1959–63. This name recognizes the activities of Shirley Anderson, wife of James C. Anderson of San Diego, California, widely known as "Antarctica Mom" among U.S. personnel wintering over in Antarctica. In the years following 1961, Mrs. Anderson communicated with thousands of wintering personnel in Antarctica and her efforts contributed greatly to their morale.

References

External links

Mountains of the Ross Dependency
Dufek Coast